Kundali may refer to:

Kuṇḍali, one of the five major Wisdom Kings in Buddhism
Kundali River in Maharashtra, India
Kundali, TV show
kundali Term in Indian Jyotish used for Horoscope, Indian Astrology